Sebastian Ugarte was a Filipino international footballer and sports executive.

Career

Youth career
From 1924-1925, Ugarte was part of the La Salle football and track and field teams.

International career
Ugarte was part of the Philippine national team that participated at the Far Eastern Championship Games. He became a household name among other players for his stints.

Non-playing career
Ugarte joined the San Miguel Corporation and was deeply involved in the now-defunct Philippine Football Association league. He led the team of San Miguel, and was also the Executive Vice-President at A. Soriano & Co. In the early 1960s, Ugarte through the Soriano group, hired British coaches Alan Rogers, Brian Birch, Danny McClelan and Graham Adams to train coaches, players and referees as well as the national youth and senior teams. In 1961, San Miguel through the Philippine Football Association hired four medical students from Spain who were proficient in football to aid the national team.

Non-football activities
After his attendance in De La Salle University, he joined the Manila Daily Bulletin as a sports reporter and covered the sports of basketball, football, swimming and track and field.

At the start of the Commonwealth era, he served as legal adviser to Resident Commissioner Joaquín Miguel Elizalde he became legal adviser to the Resident Commissioner Mike Elizalde and joined President Sergio Osmeña upon his return to the Philippines. Ugarte also worked under President Manuel Roxas in Malacañang. He was also a major at the Philippine Army.

Legacy
He was inducted to the DLSAA Sports Hall of Fame in 1993. March 1974, a football venue which was named after him, the Sebastian Ugarte Football Field was inaugurated. The Ugarte Field is located inside the Ayala Triangle Gardens but there is no football field in the area since the early 1980s.

The footballer's descendant, Antonio Ugarte later became involved in football playing for Kaya F.C. of the United Football League

References

Philippines international footballers
Filipino footballers
20th-century Filipino businesspeople
De La Salle University alumni
Year of birth missing
Place of birth missing
Year of death missing
Place of death missing
San Miguel Corporation people
Osmeña administration personnel
Roxas administration personnel
Association footballers not categorized by position